Hotel is a 2001 British-Italian comedy horror-thriller film co-written and directed by Mike Figgis. It stars Salma Hayek, Rhys Ifans, David Schwimmer, Lucy Liu, Burt Reynolds, and John Malkovich.

Plot
While a British film crew are shooting a version of The Duchess of Malfi in Venice, they in turn are being filmed by a sleazy documentary primadonna while the strange hotel staff share meals which consist of human meat. The story expands to involve a hit man, a call girl and the Hollywood producer.

The film itself makes several mentions of the Dogme 95 style of film-making, and has been described as a "Dogme film-within-a-film."

Reception
The film was not a financial success and received mixed reviews. Roger Ebert noted this and pointed out the complex nature of the film:

Many critics have agreed that Hotel is not successful, but I would ask: Not successful at what? Before you conclude that a movie doesn't work, you have to determine what it intends to do. This is not a horror movie, a behind-the-scenes movie, a sexual intrigue or a travelogue, but all four at once, elbowing one another for screen time. It reminds me above all of a competitive series of jazz improvisations, in which the musicians quote from many sources and the joy comes in the way they're able to keep their many styles alive in the same song.... The movie has to be pointless in order to make any sense.

Cast
 Lucy Liu as Kawika 
 John Malkovich as Omar Jonnson 
 David Schwimmer as Jonathan Danderfine 
 Saffron Burrows as Duchess of Malfi 
 Salma Hayek as Charlee Boux 
 Rhys Ifans as Trent Stoken
 Burt Reynolds as Flamenco Manager
 Julian Sands as Tour Guide
 Danny Huston as Hotel Clerk
 Max Beesley as Antonio
 Valentina Cervi as Hotel Maid
 Chiara Mastrioanni as Hotel Nurse
 Andrea Di Stefano as Assassin
 Mark Strong as Ferdinand
 Danny Sapani as AJ
 Ornella Muti as Flamenco Spokesman
 Laura Morante as Greta

References

External links
 
 
 
 

2001 films
2001 comedy films
2000s Italian-language films
Films directed by Mike Figgis
Films set in hotels
British comedy films
Films scored by Anthony Marinelli
Italian comedy films
2000s English-language films
2000s British films